

216001–216100 

|-bgcolor=#f2f2f2
| colspan=4 align=center | 
|}

216101–216200 

|-bgcolor=#f2f2f2
| colspan=4 align=center | 
|}

216201–216300 

|-id=241
| 216241 Renzopiano ||  || Renzo Piano (born 1937), an Italian architect and engineer, who won the Pritzker Architecture Prize in 1998. || 
|-id=261
| 216261 Mapihsia ||  || Pi Hsia Ma (born 1951), the mother of co-discoverer Man-Ti Chang || 
|-id=295
| 216295 Menorca ||  || Menorca is the most eastern and northern island of the Balearic Islands (Spain). It was declared a Biosphere Reserve in 1993 by UNESCO, and contains important megalithic monuments (navetas, talayots and taulas). || 
|}

216301–216400 

|-id=319
| 216319 Sanxia ||  || China Three Gorges University (Sānxiá Dàxué) is a university with prominent hydraulic and electrical disciplines, located in Yichang City, Hubei Province, P. R. China. || 
|-id=331
| 216331 Panjunhua ||  || Pan Junhua (born 1930), an academician of the Chinese Academy of Engineering, is the founder of both optic test equipment and optics manufacturing technology, and a pioneer of aspherical optics application in China. || 
|-id=343
| 216343 Wenchang ||  || Wenchang Shi, historically known as Zibei County, a Chinese city in Hainan Dao. || 
|-id=345
| 216345 Savigliano ||  || Savigliano, an important agricultural and industrial center in Piedmont. || 
|-id=390
| 216390 Binnig ||  || Gerd Binnig (born 1947), German physicist and Nobel laureate || 
|}

216401–216500 

|-id=428
| 216428 Mauricio ||  || Mauricio Muler, the name of both a grandfather (1904–1987) and a son (born 1999) of co-discoverer Gustavo Muler || 
|-id=433
| 216433 Milianleo ||  || Milian Leo Schwab (born 2004), son of German discoverer Erwin Schwab || 
|-id=439
| 216439 Lyubertsy ||  || Lyubertsy, a major industrial and scenic center in the Moscow region. || 
|-id=446
| 216446 Nanshida ||  || Nanshida, the Chinese abbreviation for the Nanjing Normal University, dates back to 1902 with the establishment of Sanjiang Normal College. || 
|-id=451
| 216451 Irsha ||  || Irsha, a river in Ukraine || 
|-id=462
| 216462 Polyphontes || 5397 T-2 || Polyphontes, a Greek hero, son of Autophonos, was one of the leaders of an ambush against Tydeus near Thebes. || 
|}

216501–216600 

|-id=591
| 216591 Coetzee ||  || John Maxwell Coetzee (born 1940), a South African author and academic, now living in Australia. || 
|}

216601–216700 

|-id=624
| 216624 Kaufer ||  || Andreas Kaufer (born 1968), a German astronomer || 
|}

216701–216800 

|-id=757
| 216757 Vasari ||  || Giorgio Vasari (1511–1574) was an Italian architect and art historian. He realized the palace of the Caravan in Pisa and the Florentine complex of the Uffizi. || 
|-id=780
| 216780 Lilianne ||  || Lilianne Alice Osmonson (born 2018) is the great-granddaughter of astronomer James Whitney Young, who discovered this minor planet. || 
|}

216801–216900 

|-id=888
| 216888 Sankovich ||  || Anatoly Sankovich (born 1960), an amateur astronomer and telescope maker. || 
|-id=893
| 216893 Navina ||  || Navina Lamminger (born 1978) is a German social scientist and author. She graduated in Tibetology at the University of Munich in 2013. She now works as a dramaturge for top cabaret artists. || 
|-id=897
| 216897 Golubev ||  || Golubev Vladimir Aleksandrovich (born 1940), on the astronomy faculty at Vitebsk State University, is a well-known astronomy popularizer and publicist in Belarus. || 
|}

216901–217000 

|-id=910
| 216910 Vnukov ||  || Viktor Milentinovich Vnukov (born 1950), a pilot and engineer || 
|}

References 

216001-217000